is a 1957 Japanese drama film directed by Mikio Naruse. It is based on a novel by Shūsei Tokuda. Untamed was Japan's submission to the 30th Academy Awards for the Academy Award for Best Foreign Language Film, but was not accepted as a nominee.

Cast
 Hideko Takamine
 Ken Uehara
 Masayuki Mori
 Daisuke Katō
 Eijirō Tōno
 Seiji Miyaguchi
 Tatsuya Nakadai
 Teruko Kishi
 Chieko Nakakita
 Takeshi Sakamoto
 Takashi Shimura
 Mitsuko Miura

See also
 List of submissions to the 30th Academy Awards for Best Foreign Language Film
 List of Japanese submissions for the Academy Award for Best Foreign Language Film

References

External links

1957 films
1957 drama films
Japanese drama films
1950s Japanese-language films
Japanese black-and-white films
Films based on Japanese novels
Films directed by Mikio Naruse
Toho films
Works originally published in Japanese newspapers
Films produced by Tomoyuki Tanaka
Films scored by Ichirō Saitō
1950s Japanese films